MCM-41 (Mobil Composition of Matter No. 41) is a mesoporous material with a hierarchical structure from a family of silicate and alumosilicate solids that were first developed by researchers at Mobil Oil Corporation and that can be used as catalysts or catalyst supports.

Structure 
MCM-41 consists of a regular arrangement of cylindrical mesopores that form a one-dimensional pore system. It is characterized by an independently adjustable pore diameter, a sharp pore distribution, a large surface and a large pore volume. The pores are larger than with zeolites and the pore distribution can easily be adjusted. The mesopores have a diameter of 2 nm to 6.5 nm.

Properties 
Contrary to zeolites, the framework of MCM-41 has no bronsted acid centers because there is no aluminium contained in the lattice. The acidity of alumina-doped MCM-41 therefore is comparable to that of the amorphous alumosilicates.

MCM-41 is not hydrothermally stable because of the slight wall thickness and the low degree of cross-linking of the silicate units.

Synthesis 
To achieve a defined pore diameter surfactants are used that form micelles in the synthesis solution. These micelles form templates that help build up the mesoporous framework. For MCM-41 mostly cetyltrimethylammonium bromide (CTAB) is used.

The surfactant first forms rod-like micelles that subsequently align into hexagonal arrays. After adding silica species these cover the rods. Later, calcination leads to a condensation of the silanol groups so that the silicon atoms are bridged by oxygen atoms. The organic template is oxidized and disappears.

Uses

MCM-41, as the zeolites, are widely used as catalytic cracking.  They are also used for separations.

References 

Mesoporous material